Niewodnica  (German Fischbach) is a settlement in the administrative district of Gmina Reszel, within Kętrzyn County, Warmian-Masurian Voivodeship, in northern Poland.

References

Niewodnica